is a Japanese manga series written and illustrated by Masaya Tokuhiro. The manga was serialized in Shueisha's anthology Weekly Shōnen Jump from March 1988 to June 1990.

The manga was adapted into a fifty-episode anime television series by Group TAC broadcast on TV Tokyo between October 1993 and September 1994.

Plot 
The series is about Tar-chan, a young man who was raised in the African savanna by the chimpanzee Etekichi, and his adventures protecting his home, his wife Jane, and his animal friends. As the series progresses, the simple episodic gag premise is switched to a fighting premise. Although long battles and emotional development began to unfold, after the end of these battles, the series would return to its gag style, switching back to the fighting style with each new battle.

Although the story is called Jungle King Tar-chan, Tar-chan and his friends actually live on a savanna, and a jungle setting is never actually used.

Characters 

Tar-chan is a young man who was raised in the African wild. His address is: African Savanna, Three Trees 7-4-10. He was abandoned in the savanna as a baby and found and raised by Etekichi. Other than this his past is unknown. Though there are often many humorous flashbacks to his past, whether or not any of them are true is unclear. Tar-chan's hobby is cooking, and his specialty dish is eggplant with mustard and misozuke. He is a dangerous drunk. He loves nature and animals and protects them from poachers. He can imitate the special abilities and speak the language of various animals, because he was raised by animals himself. With his superhuman reflexes and strength, he is a well-known fighter around the world, yet he is usually forced by his wife Jane to do the cleaning and supply the food. He does not seem interested in protecting his reputation as a grappler though; only in protecting the peace of the jungle.
When Tar-chan first met Jane he could not speak human language well. He was able to master submission holds after reading a fighting book for only one night, which demonstrates amazing mental ability. However, he still lacks general common sense. Tar-chan has super human abilities and strength and typically fights with his bare hands, but there are times when he will use weapons such as a blowgun and boomerang. He also has superhuman recovery, and has been known to recover quickly from injuries that take a normal man several weeks to recover from. His body is extremely flexible, and he can bend backwards to lick his own buttocks. Additionally, he can stretch the skin of his scrotum to glide, in a manner similar to a Japanese giant flying squirrel.
Although he is a brave man who cannot ignore those in danger, he is also an incredible pervert and treasures his many pornographic magazines left behind by tourists, which he collects. However, he said "to react to a beautiful girl is the instinct of the average man, the only one I truly love is Jane".

A former playmate of Tar-chan's and now his wife, when she was 17 she traveled to Africa for a photo shoot and fell in love with Tar-chan. After marrying Tar-chan she became so comfortable with living in the wild that she eventually became fat. 
Jane is the brains of the Tar-chan Family, having taught human language to Tar-chan and often taking part in the planning of fights. She can speak French, Russian, Chinese, and several other languages. She can also understand the Chimpanzee language and she communicates with Etekichi. She is capable of beating up Tar-chan and the others (as a gag), but is also shown to be strong enough to defend herself. She will do anything to make money and always bets on Tar-chan and Pedro during tournaments. She is saving money to open up a wildlife protection company.
Jane is a lacto-vegetarian. She is also seen eating candy and manjū, implying she is not too picky with food. At one point she is given special pills from Renhou that make her thin again, but becomes fat once again after receiving medical treatment for a near-fatal injury. Afterwards she bears Tar-chan 12 children: 6 boys and 6 girls. She reappears in the short story "Jane's Fruit Diet".

Etekichi is a chimpanzee who found and raised Tar-chan as a stepson and friend. At the beginning of the series Tar-chan refers to him as "father," but after it is discovered that he left his wife Eteko, he begins calling him by his actual name. Although he is a chimpanzee he often acts more intelligently than some of the important human characters. He even occasionally speaks, but always as a gag. He enjoys masturbating and having intercourse with all types of female monkeys. In the anime, episode titles were read by Kappei Yamaguchi in Etekichi's voice.

Gori-san is a mountain gorilla who taught Tar-chan how to fight. He is very gentle and kind, and like Etekichi is smarter than an ordinary gorilla, although unlike Etekichi he cannot talk.

Anabebe is Tar-chan's best friend. He is a member of Africa's strongest warrior clan, the Upopo Clan, and is the only person considered Tar-chan's equal. He at one time fought with Tar-chan over Jane, but gave up after seeing how fat she had become. His tribe later awarded him with the homely  as a wife. Anabebe was at one time a stoic warrior, but after winning the Yunker Empire Tournament, he becomes rich and is more of a gag character. He even builds a mansion in the middle of the savanna. The mansion is heavily guarded with dobermans in the garden, and Anabebe says they are to keep lions and cheetahs from entering. After winning the tournament, he began to show signs of cowardice, running from strong opponents. Although his abilities are quite good, he usually loses. The Upopo law forbids him from using weapons or cowardly techniques.
Although his tribal law states he must take his own life if defeated, he never does. Eventually he goes bankrupt and returns to his poor warrior ways.

Pedro Kazmaier is a French Karate Champion and Tar-chan's first apprentice. He is 188 cm tall and weighs 109 kg. His hobby is studying Karate, and his specialty attack is the Spinning Back Kick. He deeply respects Tar-chan from the bottom of his heart and is impressed with his every action. His catchphrase is ;. Initially he wishes to defeat Tar-chan in order to become famous, but he comes to respect his inhuman power and forcibly becomes his disciple. He was abandoned by a child at an orphanage and later adopted by a rich family who often sends him books and cognac. He is very serious and stubborn but a late bloomer when it comes to love.
In addition to Karate, he also knows Judo, and various other arts. His skill as a fighter is rather high, but according to Tar-chan he cannot handle people outside his weight class, and in fact usually loses against such opponents. He tends to hide behind the strength of Tar-chan and Ryō-shihan, but his true strength and capability is displayed in the fight against the Seikaken 4. In the vampire story arc, he briefly becomes a vampire but retains the increase in power after becoming human again.

He has a moustache and scars on his face, abdomen, and buttocks. His hobby is Mahjong.
Master Ryō is in love with the head, Renhou, and enters the Chinese tournament because the law of the 32 Western Schools forbids them from getting married unless he proves Hakkaken is the most powerful style. After the tournament he joins Tar-chan's family in order to marry her, saying now they are from different schools. Of the main characters he is the most serious and a bit rude, but after his friendship with the Family deepens he comes a kinder character. He also has the same level of perverseness as Tar-chan. Like Pedro, he briefly becomes a vampire in the vampire story arc, and retains the power up after returning to human form. He later marries Renhou and often returns to China to visit her. After their son is born he begins to show a doting parental side to his personality. He has several ki based attacks, such as the Hyappo Shinken and the Ryuuenken. His skills as a fighter are top class, and he is one of few people capable of teaming up with Tar-chan in battle.

Helen Noguchi is a 16-year-old girl who is saved by Tar-chan from a crocodile. She is half Japanese and half American. Initially she is a rather bold character who is searching for summer experience and plans to let Tar-chan take her virginity, but she later becomes friends with both him and Jane and teaches them how to manage a rice field. She was Tar-chan's biggest fan, but switched to Pedro after first seeing him. She stops appearing soon after New Jungle King Tar-chan began, but suddenly reappears for the final story as a full grown woman. In the anime her love interest is Pedro, but in the manga she marries Chikō.

After Ryō-shihan returns to China, Chikō is sent to protect the Tar-chan Family in his place. He is a pervert but also a master healer. He is also good at Chinese cooking. His abnormal personality and love of cleanliness clashes with Jane.

Media

Manga
Jungle King Tar-chan is written and illustrated by Masaya Tokuhiro. The manga was serialized in Shueisha's Weekly Shōnen Jump from March 21, 1988 to June 11, 1990. Midway through its serialization, the name of the series was changed to New Jungle King Tar-chan, and was serialize from June 18, 1990 to April 17, 1995. Shueisha collected the Jungle King Tar-chan chapters in ten tankōbon volumes, released from October 7, 1988 to January 10, 1991. Shueisha collected the New Jungle King Tar-chan chapter in twenty tankōbon volumes, released from February 8, 1991 to July 4, 1995. Shueisha republished the series in a bunkoban edition. Jungle King Tar-chan was released in three volumes published between October 16 and November 18, 2009, and New Jungle King Tar-chan in twelve volumes published between December 15, 2009 and October 15, 2010.

Anime 
A fifty-episode anime television series adaptation produced by Group TAC was broadcast on TV Tokyo from October 14, 1993 to September 29, 1994. In December 2014, it was announced that the series would be released on two DVD box sets by TC Entertainment. The first volume was released on March 27, 2015, and the second volume on April 24. TC Entertainment later re-released the series into two BD Discs between October 27 and November 24, 2017. The two opening songs  and "mama I Love You" are performed by B∀G. The first ending "Virgin Land" is performed by Ann Lewis, the second ending "Misty Heartbreak" is performed by access and the third ending "Jingle Jungle Dance" is performed by Ann Lewis.

Episode list

Video games 
Jungle King Tar-chan for Game Boy, developed by Bandai, was released on July 29, 1994. Jungle no Ōja Tar-chan: Sekai Manyū Dai Kakutō no Maki for Super Famicom, developed by Bandai, was released on September 18, 1994.

In addition, the series has been represented in two separate crossover video games for the magazine it is published in: the RPG Famicom game Famicom Jump II: The Strongest Seven and the Nintendo DS fighting game Jump Ultimate Stars.

References

External links
 

1988 manga
1990 manga
1993 anime television series debuts
Action anime and manga
Comedy anime and manga
Group TAC
Shōnen manga
Shueisha manga
Shueisha franchises
TV Tokyo original programming
Works based on Tarzan
Tarzan parodies